Francisco Nicolás Sasmay Torres (born 19 May 1998) is a Chilean footballer who plays for Rangers.

Honours
Coquimbo Unido
 Primera B (1): 2021

References

External links

1998 births
Living people
Chilean footballers
Chilean people of Diaguita descent
Indigenous sportspeople of the Americas
Chilean Primera División players
Primera B de Chile players
C.D. Antofagasta footballers
Deportes Copiapó footballers
Coquimbo Unido footballers
Rangers de Talca footballers
Association football midfielders
Place of birth missing (living people)